Matúš Bubeník (born 14 November 1989 in Hodonín) is a Slovak athlete specialising in the high jump. He won the silver medal at the 2015 Summer Universiade.

His personal bests in the event are 2.29 metres outdoor (Banská Bystrica 2015) and 2.31 metres indoor (Banská Bystrica 2015).

Competition record

References

External links 
 Matúš Bubeník at the Slovenský Olympijský Výbor 
 

1989 births
Living people
Slovak male high jumpers
People from Hodonín
World Athletics Championships athletes for Slovakia
European Games silver medalists for Slovakia
Athletes (track and field) at the 2015 European Games
European Games medalists in athletics
Athletes (track and field) at the 2016 Summer Olympics
Olympic athletes of Slovakia
Universiade medalists in athletics (track and field)
Universiade silver medalists for Slovakia
Medalists at the 2015 Summer Universiade
Sportspeople from the South Moravian Region